Frontier was a  cargo ship that was built in 1922 as Cattaro by Memeler Schiffswerke, Lindenau & Co, Memel, Germany. After a sale in 1930 she was renamed Finkenau. In 1945, she was renamed Levensau and was seized later that year by the Allies at Brunsbüttel, passed to the Ministry of War Transport (MoWT) and was renamed Empire Convoy. She was allocated to the Netherlands in 1946 and renamed Grebburg. She was sold into merchant service in 1947 and renamed Echo. A sale to South Africa in 1952 saw her renamed Frontier. The ship served until 1957 when she ran aground and broke up.

Description
Frontier was built in 1922 by Memeler Schiffsbau, Lindenau & Co Memel, Germany. The engine was built by Vulcan Werke, Stettin, Germany.

History
The first ship built by Lindenau at the Memeler Schiffswerke, Cattaro was built for the Hamburg Amerikanische Packetfahrt AG, Hamburg. In 1930, she was sold to Bugsier Reederei & Bergungs AG, Bremerhaven and was renamed Finkenau. In 1934, her Code Letters were changed to DQOY. In May 1940, Finkenau was damaged by a mine in the Baltic Sea.

In 1945, her hame was changed to Levensau. She was seized in May 1945 at Brunsbüttel, passed to the MoWT and renamed Empire Convoy. Her port of registry was changed to London. She was placed under the management of Atkinson & Co Ltd. The Code Letters GJBX and United Kingdom Official Number 180585 were allocated. In 1946, Empire Convoy was allocated to the Netherlands and was renamed Grebberg.

In 1947, she was sold to Huidig & Veder and was renamed Echo. In 1952, she was sold to African Coasters (Pty) Ltd, Durban, South Africa. In 1953, she was renamed Frontier, the fourth African Coasters ship to bear that name. She was assessed at 1,400 DWT. On 29 September, she broke up and was declared a total loss.

References

1922 ships
Ships built in Germany
Steamships of Germany
Merchant ships of Germany
World War II merchant ships of Germany
Ministry of War Transport ships
Empire ships
Steamships of the United Kingdom
Merchant ships of the United Kingdom
Steamships of the Netherlands
Merchant ships of the Netherlands
Steamships of South Africa
Merchant ships of South Africa
Maritime incidents in 1957
Shipwrecks in the Indian Ocean